Celia B. Fisher is an American psychologist. She is the Marie Ward Doty professor of ethics at Fordham University in New York City, and director of its Center for Ethics Education. Fisher is also the director of the HIV and Drug Abuse Prevention Research Ethics Training Institute (RETI). Fisher is the founding editor of the journal Applied Developmental Science and serves on the IOM Committee on Clinical Research Involving Children

Publications 
Fisher wrote Decoding the Ethics Code: A Practical Guide for Psychologists, and has co-edited other books including The Handbook of Ethical Research with Ethnocultural Populations and Communities and Research with High-Risk Populations: Balancing Science, Ethics, and Law.

Awards 

 Lifetime achievement award of the Health Improvement Institute for human research protection, 2010
 Fellow of the American Association for the Advancement of Science, 2012
 American Psychological Association award for outstanding contributions to ethics education, 2017

References

American women psychologists
21st-century American psychologists
Living people
American developmental psychologists
Fordham University faculty
Year of birth missing (living people)
Fellows of the American Association for the Advancement of Science
21st-century American women scientists
American women academics